The 1848 United States House of Representatives election in Florida was held on Monday, October 2, 1848, to elect the single United States Representative from the state of Florida, one from the state's single at-large congressional district, to represent Florida in the 31st Congress. The election coincided with the elections of other offices, including the presidential election, the senatorial election, the gubernatorial election, and various state and local elections.

The winning candidate would serve a two-year term in the United States House of Representatives from March 4, 1849, to March 4, 1851.

Candidates

Whig

Nominee 

 Edward Carrington Cabell, incumbent U.S. representative

Democratic

Nominee 

 William Pope Duval, former territorial governor of Florida

Campaign 
Cabell, despite being a Whig in the deeply Democratic supporting South, and despite running against a popular former governor in Duval, had the blessing of running alongside two other popular Whigs in the state of Florida: Zachary Taylor for president and Thomas Brown for governor, both of whom served as generals during the Second Seminole War and were seen as war heroes in the state. Despite winning by an extremely small margin in 1846, the coattail effect expanded Cabell's margin in this election.

General election

Results

Results by County

See also
1848 United States presidential election in Florida
1848 United States House of Representatives elections
1848 Florida gubernatorial election

References

1848
Florida
United States House of Representatives